Julienne Boudewijns (born 11 August 1929) is a Belgian gymnast. She competed in the women's artistic team all-around at the 1948 Summer Olympics.

References

1929 births
Possibly living people
Belgian female artistic gymnasts
Olympic gymnasts of Belgium
Gymnasts at the 1948 Summer Olympics
Sportspeople from Antwerp